Arvid Fagrell (10 August 1888 – 19 May 1919) was a Swedish football player who competed in the 1908 Summer Olympics.

In the 1908 tournament he was a part of the Swedish football team that finished in 4th place. Fagrell played in Sweden's 2-0 loss against Netherlands. He played for IFK Göteborg his whole career and became Swedish masters with them 1908 and 1910.

References

External links
 
  (archive)
 
  (archive)
 List of national matches 

1888 births
1932 deaths
Swedish footballers
Sweden international footballers
Olympic footballers of Sweden
Footballers at the 1908 Summer Olympics
IFK Göteborg players
Association football forwards